The 10.5 cm leichte Feldhaubitze 16 (10.5 cm leFH 16) was a field howitzer used by Germany in World War I and World War II.

Description 
The 10.5 cm leichte Feldhaubitze 16 was introduced in 1916 as a successor to 10.5 cm Feldhaubitze 98/09, featuring a longer barrel and hence longer range.  It had the same carriage as the 7.7 cm FK 16.

Post war 

The Treaty of Versailles limited the Reichswehr to only 84 light field howitzers, with 800 rounds of ammunition per gun. The leFH 16 remained the standard German howitzer until 1937, when the 10.5 cm leFH 18 began to replace them in the artillery battalions. Guns turned over to Belgium as reparations after World War I were taken into German Army service after the conquest of Belgium as the 10.5 cm leFH 327 (b). Romania acquired around 64 pieces from the German Army following World War I, and put them into service during the interwar years.

References

Notes

Bibliography 
 
 Engelmann, Joachim and Scheibert, Horst. Deutsche Artillerie 1934-1945: Eine Dokumentation in Text, Skizzen und Bildern: Ausrüstung, Gliederung, Ausbildung, Führung, Einsatz. Limburg/Lahn, Germany: C. A. Starke, 1974
 Gander, Terry and Chamberlain, Peter. Weapons of the Third Reich: An Encyclopedic Survey of All Small Arms, Artillery and Special Weapons of the German Land Forces 1939-1945. New York: Doubleday, 1979 
 Hogg, Ian V. German Artillery of World War Two. 2nd corrected edition. Mechanicsville, PA: Stackpole Books, 1997 
 Jäger, Herbert. German Artillery of World War One. Ramsbury, Marlborough, Wiltshire: Crowood Press, 2001

External links

German 10.5cm leichtes Feldhaubitze 16 Walkaround at Landships
Diagrams at Landships
List and pictures of World War I surviving 10.5cm leFH 16 howitzers

World War I howitzers
Field artillery of Germany
World War I artillery of Germany
World War II howitzers
World War II artillery of Germany
105 mm artillery